Spintherophyta globosa is a species of leaf beetle found in North America. It is widespread east of the Rocky Mountains, its range spanning from the East Coast west to Colorado and western Texas, and it may also occur in Arizona and Mexico. Its body is globose and colored black to dark brown, while the legs, antennae and mouth-parts are red-orange in color. The species is reported to be polyphagous.

References

Further reading

 

Eumolpinae
Articles created by Qbugbot
Beetles described in 1808
Taxa named by Guillaume-Antoine Olivier
Beetles of North America